Sukutesvara Temple located in the old town of bhubaneswar, Odisha,India,serves as purpose for community gathering. The preceding deity in this temple is a Siva- lingam (Lord Shiva) situated at the centre. The temple observes various religious sacraments like Mahasivaratri,
Chandipatha and Rudrabhisekha.

Location 

i) Address & ii) Approach: The temple is situated behind the Lingaraja market complex,
right side of the Ganges–Yamuna road branching from Gouri Sankara Temple. It is south west
of the Ganges-Yamuna precinct, west of Lakshesvara. The presiding deity is a Siva-lingam at the
centre of a circular yoni pitha. It is a living temple facing towards east.

Tradition & legends 
3. Ownership

i) Single/ Multiple: Multiple

ii) Public/ Private: Private

iii) Any other (specify): The temple is looked after by Damodar Mishra, who is the
chief priest of the temple.

iv) Name: Damodar Mishra.

v) Address: Ganges-Yamuna Road, Old Town, Bhubaneswar.

Age 
ii) Approximate date: 16th Century A.D.
iii) Source of Information: As evident from the structure, the enshrined deity and the
navagraha panel.

Property Type 
i) Precinct/ Building/ Structure/Landscape/Site/Tank: Building

ii) Subtype: Temple

iii) Typology: Pidha deul

Property use 
i) Abandoned/ in use: In use

ii) Present use: Living Temple

iii) Past use: Worshipped

Significance 
i) Historic significance: According to local tradition the temple was constructed
during the hey day of the Kesharis.

ii) Cultural significance: Various religious sacraments like Mahasivaratri,
Chandipatha and Rudrabhisekha are observed here.

iii) Social significance: Thread ceremony, mundan kriya, engagements are held
here.

iv) Associational significance:

Physical description 
i) Surrounding: The temple is surrounded by Lakhesvara temple compound
wall in east, open space in west, the Ganges–Yamuna road in north and private residential buildings
in south.

ii) Orientation: The temple is facing towards east.

iii) Architectural features (Plan and Elevation): On plan, the temple has a vimana and a frontal porch. The vimana measures 2.80 square metres with a frontal porch of 0.55 metres. There is a modern hall measuring 3.25 square metres for congregation in front of the temple which served as the jagamohana. It is pancharatha as distinguished by a central raha and a pair of anuratha and kanika pagas on either side of the raha. On elevation, the vimana is of pidhaorder that measures 1.57 metres in height. From bottom to the top the temple has a bada, gandi and mastaka. With the threefold divisions of bada the temple has a trianga bada measuring 1.57 metres in height. (pabhaga 0.38 metres, jangha 0.86 metres, baranda 0.33 metres). The gandi has three tiers measuring 1.50 metres in height. The mastaka as usual in Orissan temple has components like beki, amalaka, khapuri and kalasa that measures 0.90 metres in
height.

Raha niche & parsva devatas 
The raha niches are located in the jangha of north,
south and western sides and uniformly measures 0.50 metres in height x 0.46 metres in width and
with a depth of 0.20 metres. The images in the niches are of recent installation.

Decorative features: — 
Doorjambs: The doorjambs measuring 1.10 metres in height and 0.56 metres
in width are carved with single vertical band which is a renovated one. At the lalatabimba
there is a Gajalaxmi image seated on a double petalled lotus, flanked by two elephants.
Lintel: The architrave above the doorjamb is carved with the
navagrahas all seated in padmasana.

vi) Building material: Laterite.

vii) Construction techniques: Dry masonry

viii) Style: Kalingan

ix) Special features, if any: —

State of preservation 
i) Good/Fair/ Showing Signs of Deterioration/Advanced: Fair, due to recent renovation
work.
ii) State of Decay/Danger of Disappearance: —.

Grade (A/B/C) 
i) Architecture: B

ii) Historic: C

iii) Associational: C

iv) Social/Cultural: C

Threats to the property 
Conservation Problem and Remedies: —-
Compound wall: There is a compound wall made of laterite measuring 10.10
square metres and 1.43 metres in height with a thickness of 0.35 metres.

See also
 List of temples in Bhubaneswar

References

Further reading 
 Sukutesvara Siva Temple, Bhubaneswar, Dist.-Khurda

Hindu temples in Bhubaneswar